The European Financial Stabilisation Mechanism (EFSM) is an emergency funding programme reliant upon funds raised on the financial markets and guaranteed by the European Commission using the budget of the European Union as collateral. It runs under the supervision of the Commission and aims at preserving financial stability in Europe by providing financial assistance to member states of the European Union in economic difficulty.

The Commission fund, backed by all 27 European Union member states, has the authority to raise up to €60 billion. The EFSM is rated AAA by Fitch, Moody's and Standard & Poor's. 
The EFSM has been operational since 10 May 2010.

Programmes

Irish programme
Under the programme agreed between the Eurozone and the government of Ireland, the EFSM wil provide loans of 22.4 billion euros between 2010 and 2013. As of January 2012 the EFSM had provided 15.4 bn. Further funds have also been provided through the EFSF

Portuguese programme
Under the programme agreed between the Eurozone and the government of Portugal, the EFSM will provide loans of 26 billion euros between 2011 and 2014. As of January 2012 the EFSM had provided 15.6 bn. Further funds have also been provided through the EFSF

Greece
In July 2015 the European Commission proposed to re-activate the EFSM to provide financing for a bridging loan to the government of Greece, in order to meet its immediate commitments including loan repayments to the IMF and ECB. In August, the loan of around €7 billion was fully repaid by Greece.

Operations

2011 inaugural issuance
On 5 January 2011, the European Union, under the European Financial Stabilization Mechanism, successfully placed in the capital markets a €5 billion issue of bonds as part of the financial support package agreed for Ireland. The issuance spread was fixed at mid swap plus 12 basis points. This implies borrowing costs for EFSM of 2.59%.

Subsequent issuances
 €4.75 bn 10 yr bond issued on 24 May 2011	
 €4.75 bn 5 yr bond issued on 25 May 2011	
 €5.0 bn 10yr	bond issued on 14 Sept. 2011	
 €4.0 bn 15yr	bond issued on 22 Sept. 2011	
 €1.1 bn 7yr	bond issued on 29 Sept. 2011	
 €3.0 bn 30 yr bond issued on 9 Jan. 2012

Bailout programs for EU members (since 2008)

See also
 European Financial Stability Facility
 European Stability Mechanism
 European Fiscal Union
 List of acronyms: European sovereign-debt crisis
 Maiden Lane Transactions
 Term Asset-Backed Securities Loan Facility
 Troubled Assets Relief Program

References

Eurozone
Policy and political reactions to the Eurozone crisis

de:Europäischer Stabilisierungsmechanismus